Nikoloz Kutateladze (born 19 March 2001) is a Georgian football player. He plays for French  club Rodez.

Club career
He made his debut in the Russian Football National League for FC Spartak-2 Moscow on 13 November 2019 in a game against FC Armavir.

On 28 July 2022, Kutateladze signed with Rodez in France for two seasons.

References

External links
 
 
 
 Profile by Russian Football National League

2001 births
Footballers from Tbilisi
Living people
Footballers from Georgia (country)
Georgia (country) youth international footballers
Association football forwards
FC Anzhi Makhachkala players
FC Spartak-2 Moscow players
Rodez AF players
Russian First League players
Expatriate footballers from Georgia (country)
Expatriate footballers in the Czech Republic
Expatriate sportspeople from Georgia (country) in the Czech Republic
Expatriate footballers in France
Expatriate sportspeople from Georgia (country) in France
Expatriate footballers in Russia
Expatriate sportspeople from Georgia (country) in Russia